Bács-Bodrog County was an administrative county (comitatus) of the Kingdom of Hungary from 1802 to 1920. Most of its territory is currently part of Serbia, while a smaller part belongs to Hungary. The capital of the county was Zombor (present-day Sombor).

Name

The county was named after two older counties: Bács and Bodrog. Bács county was named after the town of Bács (present-day Bač) and Bodrog county was named after the historical town of Bodrog (which was located near present-day Bački Monoštor), which itself was named after the Slavic tribe of Abodrites (or Bodrići in Slavic) that inhabited this area in the Middle Ages. The Abodrites were originally from northwest Germany, but after their homeland fell to the Germans, some had moved to Pannonia.

Geography
[[Image:Bacs-Bodrog county map.jpg|thumb|left|alt=Map of Bács-Bodrog county in the Kingdom of Hungary|Map of Bács-Bodrog, 1891.]]
Bács-Bodrog county shared borders with several other counties of the Kingdom of Hungary: Baranya, Pest-Pilis-Solt-Kiskun, Csongrád, Torontál, Syrmia, and Virovitica (the latter two counties were part of the autonomous Kingdom of Croatia-Slavonia). The river Danube formed its western and southern border. The river Tisza formed its eastern border, down to its confluence with the Danube. Its area was 10,362 km² around 1910.

History

Bács county arose as one of the first counties of the medieval Kingdom of Hungary, in the 11th century. Bodrog county was also formed in the 11th century. The area was taken by the Ottoman Empire in the 16th century  and the two counties were abolished. During the Ottoman administration, the area of the former counties was part of the Sanjak of Segedin. The Bács and Bodrog counties were established again after the Bácska region was captured by the Habsburg monarchy in 1699; later, the two counties were joined into a single county in 1802. Some (mostly eastern) parts of Bácska were incorporated into the Theiß-Marosch section of the Military Frontier. After this part of the Military Frontier was abolished in 1751, these parts of the Batschka were also included into Bács-Bodrog county. The only part of the Batschka region which remained within the Military Frontier was Šajkaška, but it too came under civil administration in 1873.

In 1848/1849, the area of the county was claimed by the self-proclaimed Serbian Voivodeship, while between 1849 and 1860 it was part of the Voivodeship of Serbia and Banat of Temeschwar, a separate Habsburg province. During this time the county did not exist since the area was divided into districts. The county was recreated in 1860, when the Voivodeship of Serbia and Banat of Temeschwar was abolished and the area was again incorporated into the Habsburg Kingdom of Hungary.

By the Treaty of Trianon of 1920, the territory of the county was divided between the Kingdom of Serbs, Croats and Slovenes and Hungary. Most of the county (including Sombor, Subotica, and Novi Sad) was assigned to the Kingdom of Serbs, Croats and Slovenes (renamed to Yugoslavia in 1929), while the northernmost part (approximately 15% of the county), including town of Baja, was assigned to Hungary.

Aftermath
Until 1922, the southern part of the former Bács-Bodrog county was a de facto province of the Kingdom of Serbs, Croats and Slovenes with the seat in Novi Sad. The capital of this smaller Hungarian county of Bács-Bodrog was Baja.

The former Yugoslav part of the pre-1920 Bács-Bodrog county was occupied and annexed by Hungary in 1941 and Bács-Bodrog county was extended to its historic boundaries. After World War II, the border between Yugoslavia and Hungary was restored in 1947 by the Paris Peace Treaties and the county's territory were reduced again. Yugoslav part of the former Bács-Bodrog county was later divided into 3 districts and currently is part of Serbia, the autonomous region of Vojvodina.

In 1950, Bács-Bodrog was united with the southern part of former Pest-Pilis-Solt-Kiskun county to form the Bács-Kiskun county.

Demographics

During the 18th century, the Habsburgs carried out an intensive colonisation of the area, which had low population density after the last Ottoman wars. The new settlers were primarily Serbs, Hungarians, and Germans. Because many of the Germans came from Swabia, they were known as Donauschwaben'', or Danube Swabians. Some Germans also came from Austria, and some from Bavaria and Alsace. Lutheran Slovaks, Rusyns, and others were also colonized, but to a much smaller extent. According to the Austrian census from 1715, Serbs, Bunjevci, and Šokci comprised 97.6% of the county's population.

The 1720 census recorded 104,569 citizens in the county. Of those, there were 98,000 Serbs (divided into 76,000 Orthodox and 22,000 Roman Catholics, or Bunjevci and Šokci), 5,019 Magyars and 750 Germans. The Serbs (73%) and Bunjevci and Šokci (21%) had an overwhelming majority in the county at that time.

There was also an emigration of Serbs from the eastern parts of the region, which belonged to Military Frontier until 1751. After the abolishment of the Theiß-Maros section of Military Frontier, many Serbs emigrated from north-eastern parts of Batschka. They moved either to Russia (notably to New Serbia and Slavo-Serbia) or to Banat, where the Military Frontier was still needed.

By 1820, the county had grown to 387,914 in total population. The Serb (including Croats, Bunjevci and Šokci) share had dropped to 44% or 170,942, with the number of Hungarians rising to 121,688 and Germans to 91,016, or 31% and 23%, respectively.

As for the geographical distribution of the four largest ethnic groups in 1910, Hungarians mainly lived in the northern parts of the county, Germans in the western parts, Croats (including Bunjevci and Šokci) around Szabadka and Serbs in the southern parts. The city of Újvidék in the southern part of the county was the cultural and political centre of the Serbs in the 18th and 19th centuries.

Subdivisions

In the early 20th century, the subdivisions of Bács-Bodrog county were:

The towns of Baja and Bácsalmás are now in Hungary; the other towns mentioned are now in Serbia.

See also
 North, South and West Bačka districts of Serbia

Notes

References

States and territories established in 1860
States and territories disestablished in 1849
States and territories disestablished in 1920
States and territories disestablished in 1950
Counties in the Kingdom of Hungary
History of Bačka
Vojvodina under Habsburg rule